Alberto Espinoza Barrón (also known as La Fresa or 'The Strawberry') is a Mexican former drug trafficker and lieutenant of the La Familia Michoacana ("Michoacán Family") drug cartel.

Alberto Espinoza was arrested by the Mexican military on 29 December 2008, and was succeeded by Rafael Cedeño Hernández, who was also arrested on 20 April 2009.

See also
 War on Drugs
 Mérida Initiative
 Mexican Drug War

References

Living people
La Familia Michoacana traffickers
Mexican crime bosses
People of the Mexican Drug War
Mexican drug traffickers
Mexican money launderers
Mexican prisoners and detainees
Year of birth missing (living people)